The Texas Hurricanes were a professional indoor football team based in Beaumont, Texas and a charter member of the Southern Indoor Football League which began play for the SIFL's inaugural season.

Previously known as the Texas Pirates and playing out of South Houston, Texas, the Hurricanes got their new name, ownership, and temporarily moved to College Station, Texas on June 17, 2009 for 3 games. It was then announced on November 9, 2009 that the team would be relocated to Beaumont, Texas.

Season-by-season

|-
| colspan="6" align="center" | Texas Pirates/Hurricanes (SIFL)
|-
|2009 || 1 || 9 || 0 || 5th SIFL || --
|-
| colspan="6" align="center" |  Texas Hurricanes (SIFL)
|-
|2010 || -- || -- || -- || -- || --
|-
!Totals || 1 || 9 || 0
|colspan="2"|

External links
 Official website

Southern Indoor Football League teams
College Station, Texas
American football teams in Texas
American football teams established in 2009
American football teams disestablished in 2009